Dobřenice is a municipality and village in Hradec Králové District in the Hradec Králové Region of the Czech Republic. It has about 600 inhabitants.

History

The first written mention of Dobřenice is from 1339.

Sights
The Dobřenice Castle was built in the Baroque style in 1693. It replaced an older fortress. The Church of Saint Clement was built in 1739 and replaced an old wooden church from the 14t century.

References

External links

 

Villages in Hradec Králové District